is a football stadium in Sendai, Miyagi, Japan.

It hosted the 1951 Emperor's Cup and final game between Keio BRB and Osaka Club was played there on May 27, 1951.

External links

Sports venues in Sendai
Football venues in Japan